The J. L. Brandeis and Sons Store Building is located at 210 South 16th Street in the central business district of Omaha, Nebraska.  Formerly the headquarters location of the Brandeis Department Store chain, it currently holds apartments and condominiums known as The Brandeis. The building was listed on the National Register of Historic Places in 1982.

About 
The original eight stories were constructed in 1906 and were designed by architect John Latenser, Sr. in Neo-Renaissance style. The structure cost $1 million to build. Two more stories were later added to the building in 1921. Though the building was listed on the National Register of Historic Places in 1982, it has been through a series of several internal remodeling ventures that have had mixed results. In early 2008, the building was purchased by Townsend Inc, of Overland Park, Kansas, and was converted to a high-end mixed use residential and commercial space. The building was divided into three subdivisions: the lowest floor, "The Pavilion", has area reserved for commercial space, the management offices and security. There is also a refurbished food court with local and national food vendors, flat screen televisions and a fountain. Floors two to seven ("The Renata") are reserved for high-end apartments, with the second floor housing a fitness center and movie theater for building residents. Floors eight and nine ("The Enclave") consist of luxury condominiums that are separate and secure from the apartments. The building also features an on-site concierge and heated underground parking. The tenth floor at the top of the building, originally a gorgeous ballroom,  is now converted into one-bedroom apartments.

See also 
 History of Omaha

References

External links 

 Brandeis Building from the Omaha Public Library system.
 Brandeis Building Condominiums website.

History of Downtown Omaha, Nebraska
National Register of Historic Places in Omaha, Nebraska
Commercial buildings completed in 1906
John Latenser Sr. buildings
Office buildings in Omaha, Nebraska
Commercial buildings on the National Register of Historic Places in Nebraska
Department stores on the National Register of Historic Places
1906 establishments in Nebraska